The 2006 IIHF World Championship Division III was an international ice hockey tournament run by the International Ice Hockey Federation. The tournament was contested on April 24–29, 2006 in Reykjavík, Iceland. Iceland won the championship and gained promotion, along with Turkey, into the 2007 Division II tournament.

Participants

Fixtures
All times local.

Ranking and statistics

Scoring leaders
List shows the top skaters sorted by points, then goals. If the list exceeds 10 skaters because of a tie in points, all of the tied skaters are left out.
GP = Games played; G = Goals; A = Assists; Pts = Points; +/− = Plus/minus; PIM = Penalties in minutes; POS = PositionSource: IIHF.com

Leading goaltenders
Only the top five goaltenders, based on save percentage, who have played 40% of their team's minutes are included in this list.
TOI = Time On Ice (minutes:seconds); SA = Shots against; GA = Goals against; GAA = Goals against average; Sv% = Save percentage; SO = ShutoutsSource: IIHF.com

References

IIHF World Championship Division III
4
2005–06 in Icelandic ice hockey
2006 in Irish sport
Ice hockey in Ireland
2005–06 in Turkish ice hockey
2006
Sports competitions in Reykjavík
2000s in Reykjavík
April 2006 sports events in Europe